Astragalus coarctatus is a species of milkvetch that is endemic to northeastern Turkey, and is only known from its type specimen, collected in 1871 in Kars Province.

References

coarctatus
Endemic flora of Turkey